Diego Evangelista dos Santos, better known as Dieguinho (September 29, 1989 in Caarapó) is a Brazilian footballer who currently plays for Duque de Caxias.

External links

1989 births
Living people
Brazilian footballers
Fluminense FC players
Brasiliense Futebol Clube players
Atlético Clube Goianiense players
Tupi Football Club players
Campeonato Brasileiro Série A players
Association football defenders